Dentist in the Chair is a 1960 British comedy film, directed by Don Chaffey and starring Bob Monkhouse, Ronnie Stevens, Eric Barker and Vincent Ball. The screenplay was written by Val Guest, and based on a novel by Matthew Finch. Additional scenes were written by Bob Monkhouse and George Wadmore.

Dentist on the Job (1961), a sequel, followed.

Plot
Two dental students, David Cookson (Monkhouse) and Brian Dexter (Ronnie Stevens) become mixed up in the misadventures of a thief, Sam Field (played by Kenneth Connor), when he tries to sell them stolen dental equipment.

Cast
Bob Monkhouse as David Cookson
Peggy Cummins as Peggy Travers
Kenneth Connor as Sam Field
Eric Barker as The Dean
Ronnie Stevens as Brian Dexter
Vincent Ball as Michaels
Eleanor Summerfield as Ethel
Reginald Beckwith as Mr. Watling
Stuart Saunders as Inspector Richardson
Ian Wallace as Dentist
Peggy Simpson as Miss Brent
Jean St. Clair as Lucy
Rosie Lee as Maggie
Charlotte Mitchell as Woman in Surgery
Philip Gilbert as Young Man in Surgery
Jeremy Hawk as Dental Instructor
Harry Hutchinson as Porter
Alf Dean as Wrestler
Sheree Winton as Jayne
Julie Alexander as Nurse

Reception
The twelve most popular films of the year in Britain in 1960 were Doctor in Love, Carry On Constable, Hercules Unchained, Two-Way Stretch, Conspiracy of Hearts, The League of Gentlemen, Sink the Bismark, Psycho, Oceans 11, Suddenly Last Summer, Dentist in the Chair and School for Scoundrels. Kine Weekly said it "proved a terrific turn up" at the box office.

References

External links

1960 films
1960 comedy films
British black-and-white films
British comedy films
1960s English-language films
Films based on British novels
Films directed by Don Chaffey
Films shot at Pinewood Studios
1960s British films